The Wales National Ice Rink (WNIR) was an ice rink in Cardiff, Wales. It was the former home of the Cardiff Devils ice hockey team. The WNIR was opened in September 1986, and was inaugurated by the Duchess of York on 27 April 1987. Meat Loaf performed on December 4th, 1993 on the Everything Louder tour to a crowd of 4,300. It was demolished in September 2006 to make way for expansion of the St David's, Cardiff Shopping Centre, with the site now occupied by John Lewis.

Closure
In April 2006, the final ice hockey game hosted at the location was a special "End Of An Era" game featuring former Devils players against the 2005/2006 Devils squad. The facility later closed to leisure skaters in June 2006. Following the closure, the temporary Cardiff Bay Ice Rink was constructed within the Cardiff Bay area of Cardiff, which was used to host Devil's home games until the opening of Ice Arena Wales in March 2016.

See also 
Sport in Cardiff

References

External links 
 Last Day of Demolition

Indoor ice hockey venues in Wales
Defunct sports venues in Wales
Demolished buildings and structures in Wales
Sports venues completed in 1986
Sports venues demolished in 2006
1986 establishments in Wales
2006 disestablishments in Wales